Abu Sahl Khujandi was a Persian vizier of the Ghaznavid Sultan Ibrahim of Ghazna. Before becoming vizier, Abu Sahl served in the divan of the Ghaznavid Empire, and then succeeded Abu Bakr ibn Abi Salih as the vizier of Ibrahim in 1059. However, Abu Sahl later fell into disfavor, and was imprisoned and blinded.

References

Sources 
C. E. Bosworth "Abu Sahl Khujandi." Encyclopedia Iranica. 24 January 2014. <http://www.iranicaonline.org/articles/abu-sahl-kojandi-vizier-of-the-ghaznavids-in-the-5th-11th-century>

11th-century deaths
Year of birth unknown
11th-century Iranian people
Ghaznavid viziers
People from Khujand